Pettah may refer to:

 Pettah of Ahmednagar, a fortified town outside the Fort of Ahmednagar stormed by British soldiers in 1803 during Second Anglo-Maratha War
 Pettah, Colombo, a neighborhood in Colombo, Sri Lanka located east of the City centre fort. 

 Pettah, Thiruvananthapuram, a residential suburb of Thiruvananthapuram, the capital of Kerala, India.

See also
Petta (disambiguation)
Pita
Pitta